Inimabakesh (fl. late 3rd millennium BCE) was the fifth Gutian ruler of the Gutian Dynasty of Sumer mentioned on the Sumerian King List. Inimabakesh was the successor of Elulmesh. Igeshaush then succeeded Inimabakesh.

See also

 History of Sumer
 List of Mesopotamian dynasties

References

Gutian dynasty of Sumer